Lists of ambassadors of Japan may refer to:

List of ambassadors of Japan to Algeria
List of ambassadors of Japan to Angola
List of ambassadors of Japan to Australia
List of ambassadors of Japan to Czechoslovakia and the Czech Republic
List of ambassadors of Japan to Finland
List of Japanese ministers, envoys and ambassadors to Germany
List of ambassadors of Japan to Lithuania
List of ambassadors of Japan to Malaysia
List of ambassadors of Japan to the Philippines
List of ambassadors of Japan to South Korea
List of ambassadors of Japan to Thailand
List of ambassadors of Japan to the United States

Ambassadors
Lists of ambassadors by country of origin